Edgar Allan Poe (1809–1849) was an American writer, editor, and literary critic.

Edgar Allan Poe, sometimes misspelled Edgar Allen Poe, may also refer to:


Arts and entertainment
 Edgar Allan Poe Awards, a literary award
 Edgar Allen Poe (film), a 1909 film

Schools in the United States
 Edgar Allan Poe School, Philadelphia, Pennsylvania, now the Girard Academic Music Program  
 The former Edgar Allan Poe School of English, University of Virginia
 Edgar Allan Poe Middle School, Fairfax County, Virginia
 Edgar Allan Poe Middle School, San Antonio Independent School District, San Antonio, Texas
 Edgar Allan Poe Elementary School (disambiguation)

Other uses
 Edgar Allan Poe (attorney general) (1871–1961), Attorney General of Maryland 
 USS E.A. Poe (IX-103), a United States Navy World War II dry storage ship formerly named Edgar Allan Poe
 Edgar Allan Poe Museum (disambiguation), also Edgar Allan Poe House

See also
 Edgar Poe (A Series of Unfortunate Events), a character in A Series of Unfortunate Events